Magoodhoo (Dhivehi: މަގޫދޫ) is one of the inhabited islands of Faafu Atoll in the Maldives.

Geography

Demography

References

Populated places in the Maldives
Islands of the Maldives